A suicide bomber struck AIG Ashraf Noor's car on 24 November 2017, as he was driving to work in Hayatabad, Peshawar, and the car caught fire, killing Ashraf Noor and his guard. In the attack eight others police in the AIG's squad were injured as a result of the blast and they were taken to Hayatabad Medical Complex for treatment.

Bombing
The suicide bomber struck his motorcycle into Ashraf Noor's vehicle after which he detonated his explosives which left the car in flames. Around 15-20 kilograms of explosives were used in the blast, and two vehicles were damaged in the attack.

Aftermath
Noor was buried with full police honors in his ancestral village, Skardu, on 24 November 2017.

Reactions
 Prime Minister Shahid Khaqan Abbasi expressed his condolences with the affected families by the blast, and he also said that fight against terrorism will be taken to its logical end, and the terror attacks will not damp the determination of the nation and law enforcement agencies. He also directed government authorities to ensure fleet medical aid to the wounded.
 Pakistan Peoples Party chairman Bilawal Bhutto Zardari also condemned the suicide bomb attack and sent his condolences to the families of the martyred. He tweeted:

 State Minister for Information Marriyum Aurangzeb also condemned the suicide bomb attack and said every Pakistani will continue to stand against terrorism.
 Pakistan Tehreek-e-Insaf chairman Imran Khan tweeted:

 Chief of Army Staff (COAS) General Qamar Javed Bajwa and DG ISPR Major General Asif Ghafoor saluted the supreme sacrifice of AIG Ashraf Noor. They tweeted:

See also 
 2017 Peshawar Agriculture Directorate attack
 List of terrorist incidents in November 2017

References 

2017 murders in Pakistan
Crime in Peshawar
November 2017 crimes in Asia
Suicide bombings in Pakistan
Terrorist incidents in Pakistan in 2017
Insurgency in Khyber Pakhtunkhwa